Žan Jevšenak (born 15 May 2003) is a Slovenian professional footballer who plays as a midfielder for Portuguese side Benfica B.

Club career
Born in Maribor, Slovenia, Jevšenak joined Benfica in 2019, from Bravo. In September 2021, Jevšenak signed a new contract with the Lisbon-based club. He made his professional debut with Benfica B in a 2–1 loss to Mafra in April 2022.

International career
Jevšenak has represented Slovenia at all youth international levels from under-15 to under-21.

Career statistics

Club

Honours
Benfica
 Campeonato Nacional de Juniores: 2021–22
 UEFA Youth League: 2021–22
Under-20 Intercontinental Cup: 2022

References

External links
Žan Jevšenak at NZS 

2003 births
Living people
Sportspeople from Maribor
Slovenian footballers
Slovenia youth international footballers
Slovenia under-21 international footballers
Association football midfielders
Liga Portugal 2 players
NK Aluminij players
NK Bravo players
S.L. Benfica B players
Slovenian expatriate footballers
Slovenian expatriate sportspeople in Portugal
Expatriate footballers in Portugal